Duane Alexander Johnson (born April 2, 1991) is an American professional basketball player for Maccabi Ma'ale Adumim of the Israeli National League. He played college basketball for East Stroudsburg, where he was part of four straight PSAC Final Four teams and three NCAA Division II Tournament teams. He has since played professionally in Australia, Ireland and Luxembourg.

High school career
Johnson attended Penn Wood High School in Lansdowne, Pennsylvania, where he was a two-time first-team All-Delaware County honoree playing for coach Clyde Jones. As a senior in 2008–09, he led Penn Wood in scoring (13.7 ppg), rebounding (7.0 rpg) and blocked shots (1.9 bpg), and was team captain. He subsequently earned second-team All-District I and second-team AAAA all-state honors as a senior, helping the Patriots finish with an overall record of 28–4. On March 21, 2009, he helped guide Penn Wood to their first state basketball title in school history, defeating York William Penn 72–53. In the title game, Johnson recorded 20 points, 10 rebounds and four steals. Johnson finished his high school career on Penn Wood's 1,000-point scorers list with 1,082 total points.

College career
As a freshman at East Stroudsburg in 2009–10, Johnson played in all 30 games for a 24–6 Warriors team that competed in the PSAC Final Four and NCAA tournament. He averaged 6.9 points and 3.4 rebounds in 17.8 minutes per game, and earned three PSAC East Freshman of the Week honors. In his third game for the Warriors, he scored a season-high 16 points.

As a sophomore in 2010–11, Johnson earned second-team All-PSAC East honors after leading the Warriors in scoring (12.4 ppg) and ranking third in rebounding (4.9 rpg). He played in 28 games and made 27 starts, and helped the Warriors reach their second straight PSAC Final Four. He also earned Pocono Classic All-Tournament Team honors. In the second last game of the season, he scored a season-high 26 points.

As a junior in 2011–12, Johnson earned first-team All-PSAC East honors and helped the Warriors win the PSAC championship, guiding them back to the NCAA tournament for the second time in three years. He appeared in 32 games for the Warriors and started 31 of them, averaging 12.4 points, 6.2 rebounds, 2.4 assists and 1.4 steals in 32.7 minutes per game. On February 4, he scored a career-high 29 points against Kutztown.

As a senior in 2012–13, Johnson earned second-team All-PSAC East honors after helping the Warriors to a third NCAA tournament appearance in four years, and a fourth straight PSAC Final Four appearance. He was subsequently named ESU's Male Senior Athlete of the Year and ESU's Coaches Award recipient alongside Terrance King. He started in all 28 games for the Warriors as a senior, averaging 14.1 points, 6.2 rebounds, 1.9 assists and 1.5 steals in 31.5 minutes per game. During the season, the team recorded a school record-tying 14-game winning streak, and had a nine-game road winning streak, the latter coming to an end one game shy from tying a school record set between 1926–28. Both streaks came to an end on February 16 against Shippensburg, a game which saw Johnson tie his career high of 29 points.

In four years at ESU, Johnson and teammate Terrance King led the Warriors to unprecedented success, including an 82–37 record from 2009–10 through 2012–13. Johnson left ESU seventh in career points (1,347), ninth in rebounds (608), fourth in steals (148) and eighth in blocks (90), and was just the third three-time All-PSAC East selection in program history. In addition, Johnson played 3,267 career minutes, the most by an ESU player since 1990, and led the Warriors in minutes played as a sophomore, junior and senior.

College statistics

|-
| style="text-align:left;"| 2009–10
| style="text-align:left;"| East Stroudsburg
| 30 || 0 || 17.8 || .471 || .417 || .701 || 3.4 || 1.2 || .7 || .6 || 6.9
|-
| style="text-align:left;"| 2010–11
| style="text-align:left;"| East Stroudsburg
| 28 || 27 || 28.8 || .504 || .341 || .744 || 4.9 || 1.8 || 1.5 || .7 || 12.4
|-
| style="text-align:left;"| 2011–12
| style="text-align:left;"| East Stroudsburg
| 32 || 31 || 32.7 || .435 || .254 || .752 || 6.2 || 2.4 || 1.4 || .9 || 12.4
|-
| style="text-align:left;"| 2012–13
| style="text-align:left;"| East Stroudsburg
| 28 || 28 || 31.5 || .441 || .314 || .787 || 6.2 || 1.9 || 1.5 || .9 || 14.1
|-
| style="text-align:center;" colspan="2"|Career
| 118 || 86 || 27.7 || .459 || .312 || .753 || 5.2 || 1.8 || 1.3 || .8 || 11.4
|-

Professional career

Corio Bay Stingrays (2014)
In December 2013, Johnson signed a professional contract with the Corio Bay Stingrays in Australia for the 2014 Big V State Championship season. He was touted as being one of the most athletic imports ever to play in Geelong, as well as the most athletically gifted player in the league. In his debut for the Stingrays on March 15, he scored 25 points in a 102–86 win over the Ringwood Hawks. On March 29, he recorded his first double-double of the season with 27 points and 12 rebounds in a 98–97 win over the Bulleen Boomers. On June 14, he had 17 points and 18 rebounds in a 94–63 win over the Whittlesea Pacers. On June 28, he recorded a season-high 30 points and 14 rebounds in a 97–90 win over Boomers. He had a second 30-point effort on July 20 in a 100–98 win over the Waverley Falcons. He helped the Stingrays finish the regular season in second place with a 22–2 record before leading them to the grand final series. In game one of the best-of-three series against Ringwood, Johnson recorded 25 points and nine rebounds in a 92–85 win. However, they went on to lose the next two games to the Hawks to finish as runners-up. In 27 games, he averaged 20.4 points, 9.2 rebounds, 1.8 assists, 1.1 steals and 1.3 blocks per game. He was subsequently nominated for All-Star forward selection, but ultimately missed out on the All-Star Five.

DCU Saints (2015–2016)
On November 20, 2015, Johnson signed with DCU Saints in Ireland for the rest of the 2015–16 Premier League season. He made his debut the following day, recording 16 points and 30 rebounds in a 73–70 win over UCD Marian. In his next game for the team on December 5, Johnson had 18 points and 26 rebounds in an 80–67 National Cup loss to Marian. In his third game on December 13, he recorded 40 points and 26 rebounds in a 96–78 regular-season win over UL Eagles. On December 20, he scored 39 points in a 100–90 win over UCC Demons. He was subsequently named the league's Player of the Month for December. Saints finished the regular season in sixth place with a 7–11 record, going 7–5 with Johnson in the line-up after starting 0–6. In 12 games, he averaged league-leading numbers with 26.2 points and 18.7 rebounds, in addition to 3.9 assists, 2.6 steals and 3.1 blocks in 38.7 minutes per game. He subsequently earned Premier League All-Star First Pick honors.

Black Star Mersch (2016–2020)
For the 2016–17 season, Johnson moved to Luxembourg to play for Black Star Mersch in the Nationale 2. In January 2017, Johnson suffered a broken leg and missed the rest of the season. He continued on with Black Star in 2017–18, 2018–19, and 2019–20. In February 2020, Black Star were elevated to the first-tiered Total League, where in five games to complete the 2019–20 season, Johnson averaged 30.0 points, 14.8 rebounds, 4.8 assists and 2.4 steals per game.

BBC Arantia Larochette (2020–2022)
In June 2020, Johnson signed with BBC Arantia Larochette of the Total League, returning to Luxembourg for a fifth season. He missed Arantia's play-in game after injuring his foot in the final regular season game. In 21 games during the 2020–21 season, he averaged 21.6 points, 10.1 rebounds, 3.3 assists and 2.6 steals per game.

On April 7, 2021, Johnson signed a contract extension with Arantia Larochette for the 2021–22 season. On November 6, 2021, he scored 46 points in a 79–76 win over AB Contern. He helped Arantia reach the Luxembourg Cup final, where they lost 84–65 to Basket Esch despite Johnson's 22 points and 12 rebounds. In 23 games, he averaged 24.3 points, 9.9 rebounds, 3.2 assists, 2.6 steals and 1.4 blocks per game.

Maccabi Ma'ale Adumim (2022–present)
In July 2022, Johnson signed a two-year deal with Maccabi Ma'ale Adumim of the Israeli National League.

References

External links
Israeli National League profile
Luxembourg League profile
Irish League profile
ESU Warriors college bio
MaxPreps.com profile
"Johnson believes the Saints can win out" at thecollegeview.com

1991 births
Living people
American expatriate basketball people in Australia
American expatriate basketball people in Ireland
American expatriate basketball people in Israel
American expatriate basketball people in Luxembourg
American men's basketball players
Basketball players from Pennsylvania
East Stroudsburg Warriors men's basketball players
Forwards (basketball)
Place of birth missing (living people)